Margaret Pearson, also known as the Padiham witch because she lived in the town of Padiham in Lancashire, England, was among those tried with the Pendle witches in the Lancashire witch trials of 1612. This, her third trial for witchcraft, took place on 19 August at Lancaster Assizes in front of Sir James Altham and Sir Edward Bromley.

One of the Pendle witches, Anne Whittle, also known as Chattox, had accused Pearson of "riding a mare ... to death", so she was charged with killing a horse. The only other evidence submitted against her came from a fellow resident of Padiham, Jennet Booth, who said that on a visit to Pearson's husband while Margaret was in prison a toad had jumped out of a pile of firewood. Found guilty of non-capital witchcraft Pearson escaped execution, and was instead sentenced to be pilloried in Lancaster, Clitheroe, Whalley and Padiham on four market days, followed by a year in prison.

References

Notes

Citations

Bibliography

1612 in law
1612 in England
History of Burnley Borough
Lancashire folklore
People convicted of witchcraft
People from Padiham
Witch trials in England